Michael W. Toffel is currently the Senator John Heinz Professor of Environmental Management at Harvard Business School. His research focuses on corporate environmental strategy, managing occupational health and safety and working conditions in supply chains, and CEO activism.

Education
2005 Ph.D. Business Administration, University of California, Berkeley. Thesis: “Voluntary Environmental Management Initiatives: Smoke Signals or Smoke Screens?”
1996 MBA, Yale School of Management, New Haven, CT
1996 Masters of Environmental Management, Yale School of Forestry and Environmental Studies, New Haven, CT
1990 B.A. Government with honors, Lehigh University, Bethlehem, PA

References

Year of birth missing (living people)
Living people
Harvard Business School faculty
American economists
Haas School of Business alumni
Yale School of Management alumni
Lehigh University alumni
Yale School of Forestry & Environmental Studies alumni